A Maison du Tourisme is usually the municipal French regulatory body of tourism; i.e., Maison du Tourisme de Grenoble.

External links
French Tourism Office
France Guide Official website of the French Government Tourist Office, in English

Government agencies of France